Georges Wilson (16 October 1921 – 3 February 2010) was a French film and television actor. He was the father of French actor Lambert Wilson.

Biography

Wilson was born in Champigny-sur-Marne, Seine (now Val-de-Marne) as the illegitimate son of a French father and an Irish mother. His professional surname, Wilson, derives from his Irish grandmother; his birthname has not been made public.

He was nominated for a BAFTA Film Award, and also nominated for a César Award. Georges Wilson's last film was Mesrine: Public Enemy Number One.

From 1963 to 1972 Georges Wilson was the director of the Théâtre national de Chaillot (formerly known as the Théâtre National Populaire).

Georges Wilson died in Rambouillet in 2010, aged 88, from undisclosed causes.

Selected filmography

 Martin Roumagnac (1946) – Un jeune homme dans le convoi funèbre (uncredited)
 Maître après Dieu (1951) – Un passager juif (uncredited)
 Open Letter (1953) – Un locataire
 La môme vert-de-gris (1953) – Duncan aka Melander
 The Red and the Black (1954) – M. Binet
 Les Hussards (1955) – Le capitaine Georges
 Bonjour Toubib (1957) – Timbarelle
 The Green Mare (1959) – Jules Haudouin
 Dialogue with the Carmelites (1960) – L'aumônier du Carmel
 Le Farceur (1960) – Guillaume Berlon
 Wasteland (1960) – His Honour J. Royer the juvenile judge
 Le Caïd (1960) – Monsieur 'A'
 Une aussi longue absence (1961) – Le clochard
 The Fascist (1961) – Prof. Erminio Bonafé
 Tintin and the Golden Fleece (1961) – Captain Haddock
 The Seven Deadly Sins (1962) – Valentin (segment "Gourmandise, La")
 Disorder (1962) – Don Giuseppe
 Leviathan (1962) – Husband
 Carillons sans joie (1962) – Le père de Léa
 Le Diable et les Dix Commandements (1962) – Marcel Messager (segment "Tes père et mère honoreras")
 The Longest Day (1962) – Alexandre Renaud
 The Four Days of Naples (1962) – Reformatory Director (uncredited)
 Mandrin (1962) – Bélissard
 Any Number Can Win (1963) – Walther (uncredited)
 Sweet and Sour (1963) – Casimir
 Chair de poule (1963) – Thomas
 The Empty Canvas (1963) – Cecilia's Father
 Faites sauter la banque! (1964) – L'agent cycliste / The policeman
 Lucky Jo (1964) – Simon
 Un monde nouveau (1966) – Le Patron
 The Stranger (1967) – Examining Magistrate
 More Than a Miracle (1967) – Jean-Jacques Bouché 'Monzu'
 Beatrice Cenci (1969) – Francesco Cenci
 Max et les Ferrailleurs (1971) – Le Commissaire
 Blanche (1971) – The King
 The Case Is Closed, Forget It (1971) – Campoloni
 La violenza: quinto potere (1972) – Crupi
 Don't Torture a Duckling (1972) – Francesco
 Il generale dorme in piedi (1972) – Gen. Botta
 Sono stato io (1973)
 The Three Musketeers (1973) – Treville
 ...E di Saul e dei sicari sulle vie di Damasco (1973) – Shaùl
 Chinese in Paris (1974) – Lefranc
 Love at the Top (1974) – Lourceuil
 The Slap (1974) – Pierre
 The Peaceful Age (1975) – L'altro
  (1977) – Dr. Rudolf Fachmin
 The Apprentice Heel (1977) – Maître Chappardon / Monsieur Marcel / L'héritier ronchon / L'expert escroc
 Tendre Poulet (1977) – Alexandre Mignonac
 Ecco noi per esempio (1977) – Melano Melani
 Les Ringards (1978) – CommissaireGarmiche
 Lady Oscar (1979) – M. de Bouillé, French Guard General
 Au bout du bout du banc (1979) – Eric Oppenheim
 Le bar du téléphone (1980) – Léopold Kretzchman
 Le cheval d'orgueil (1980) – Récitant / Narrator (voice)
 Asphalte (1981) – Le professeur Kalendarian – un chirurgien débordé
 Cserepek (1981)
 Fruits of Passion (1981) – Le narrateur (voice)
 Portrait of a Woman, Nude (1981) – Arch. Zanetto
 A Captain's Honor (1982) – Le bâtonnier
 Itinéraire bis (1983) – Charles
 Tangos, the Exile of Gardel (1985) – Jean-Marie
 Gandahar (1988) – Métamorphe (voice)
 La Passion de Bernadette (1989) – Mgr Dupanloup
 My Mother's Castle (1990) – Le comte colonel
 La Tribu (1991) – Castaing
 Mayrig (1991) – (uncredited)
 Cache Cash (1994) – Louis
 Marie de Nazareth (1995) – Récitant (voice)
 Marquise (1997) – Floridor
 Sentimental Destinies (2000) – Robert Barnery
 Not Here to Be Loved (2005) – Le père de Jean-Claude
 L'Ennemi public nº 1 (2008) – Henri Lelièvre (final film role)

References

External links

1921 births
2010 deaths
People from Champigny-sur-Marne
French male film actors
French male television actors
French people of Irish descent
Commandeurs of the Ordre des Arts et des Lettres